The 2019–20 ISU Grand Prix of Figure Skating was a series of invitational senior internationals which ran from October 2019 through December 2019. Medals were awarded in the disciplines of men's singles, ladies's singles, pair skating, and ice dance. Skaters earned points based on their placement at each event and the top six in each discipline qualified to compete at the Grand Prix Final in Turin, Italy.

Organized by the International Skating Union, the series set the stage for the 2020 Europeans, the 2020 Four Continents, and the 2020 World Championships. The corresponding series for junior-level skaters was the 2019–20 ISU Junior Grand Prix.

As part of a new ISU deal, the 2019–20 Grand Prix series was streamed live on YouTube with geographical restrictions. The ISU has always streamed the Junior Grand Prix internationally without restrictions.

Schedule
The series comprised the following events:

Requirements 
Skaters were eligible to compete on the senior Grand Prix circuit if they had reached the age of 15 before July 1, 2019. They were also required to have earned a minimum total score at certain international events.

Assignments
The ISU announced the preliminary assignments on June 20, 2019.

Men

Ladies

Pairs

Ice dance

Changes to preliminary assignments

Skate America

Skate Canada

Internationaux de France

Cup of China

Rostelecom Cup

NHK Trophy

Medal summary

Medalists

Medal standings

Qualification 
At each event, skaters earned points toward qualification for the Grand Prix Final. Following the sixth event, the top six highest scoring skaters/teams advanced to the Final. The points earned per placement were as follows:

There were originally seven tie-breakers in cases of a tie in overall points:
 Highest placement at an event. If a skater placed 1st and 3rd, the tiebreaker is the 1st place, and that beats a skater who placed 2nd in both events.
 Highest combined total scores in both events. If a skater earned 200 points at one event and 250 at a second, that skater would win in the second tie-break over a skater who earned 200 points at one event and 150 at another.
 Participated in two events.
 Highest combined scores in the free skating/free dance portion of both events.
 Highest individual score in the free skating/free dance portion from one event.
 Highest combined scores in the short program/short dance of both events.
 Highest number of total participants at the events.

If a tie remained, it was considered unbreakable and the tied skaters all advanced to the Grand Prix Final.

Qualification standings
Bold denotes Grand Prix Final qualification.

Qualifiers

Top scores

Men

Best total score

Best short program score

Best free skating score

Ladies

Best total score

Best short program score

Best free skating score

Pairs

Best total score

Best short program score

Best free skating score

Ice dance

Best total score

Best rhythm dance score

Best free dance score

Prize money 
Each event of the ISU Junior Grand Prix of Figure Skating had a total prize money of U.S. $180,000. It was awarded as follows:

If athletes were invited for the exhibition gala, but failed to participate with an appropriate show number different from their competition programs, the awarded prize money was reduced by $3,000. Singles' skaters and pairs and ice dance couples who were invited to participate in the gala, but did not receive prize money from their event placement, received $200 per skater and $300 per couple, respectively.

References

External links
 ISU Grand Prix of Figure Skating at the International Skating Union

 

ISU Grand Prix of Figure Skating
2019 in figure skating